Mini is a 1995 Indian Malayalam-language film directed by P. Chandrakumar, written by Iskantar Mirsa, and produced by Madhu. The film depicts the problem of alcoholism through the determined efforts of a young girl to save her father from self-destruction. It stars Aarati Ghanashyam, Chandrahasan, Kuckoo Parameswaran, Babu G. Nair and Malini Nair in pivotal roles. It won the National Film Award for Best Film on Family Welfare. Aarati Ghanashyam won the Kerala State Film Award for Best Child Artist and Kerala Film Critics Association Award for Best Child Artist.

Plot

Mini is a 10-year-old school girl from a middle-class family whose father is a habitual drunkard who beats up his wife as a rule and throws tantrums into the early hours of the morning. The mother and daughter suffer in silence; but the neighbours find the daily antics a nuisance. Despite their vehement protests things go from bad to worse.

Mini prays to god and wishes that her father stop drinking and turn over a new life. She goes to the temple but to no avail. She then learns about Mahatma Gandhi and his hunger strike. She goes on a hunger strike and when she collapses she is admitted to the hospital. Her father realises his fault and breaks down. He then promises never to touch alcohol again. Mini's non-violent approach brings her victory and joy.

Cast
 Aarati Ghanashyam as Mini
 Chandrahasan as Mini's father
 Kuckoo Parameswaran as Mini's mother
 Babu G. Nair
 Malini Nair
 N Ramachandran Nair

References

1990s Malayalam-language films
Films about alcoholism
Best Film on Family Welfare National Film Award winners
Films directed by P. Chandrakumar